The Coliseo Eduardo Dibos is a multi-purpose indoor arena located in San Borja, Lima, Peru, exactly between Angamos Ave. and Aviacion Ave. The arena has a capacity for 4,600 people. This arena is used to host sport events as volleyball and basketball, also many other secondary sports. It is also used for circus events and Bugs Bunny on Ice in August 2006. The Dibos Coliseum, with the Coliseo Mariscal Caceres, are the most important venues for non-football sports in Lima. This venue also hosts concerts as in 1994 the Gaitan Castro brothers were the first Peruvian artists to sell out the arena for a concert. A boxing event sold out featuring the WBA world champion Kina Malpartida and Halana Dos Santos on 20 June 2009. It was remodeled to house the venue in the 3x3 basketball and the traditional 5x5 basketball competitions at the 2019 Pan American Games.

References

Sports venues in Lima
Indoor arenas in Peru
Venues of the 2019 Pan and Parapan American Games